Abou El Kacem Hadji (born August 22, 1990 in Oujda, Morocco) is an Algerian football player who plays for Algerian Ligue Professionnelle 2 club A Bou Saâda.

Club career
On January 4, 2012, Hadji was loaned out by WA Tlemcen to MC Alger until the end of the season.

References

External links
 
 

1990 births
Algerian footballers
Algerian Ligue Professionnelle 1 players
Living people
MC Alger players
People from Oujda
WA Tlemcen players
JSM Béjaïa players
Algerian expatriates in Morocco
Association football midfielders
21st-century Algerian people